Partners in Crime is a British cosy mystery drama television series that began on BBC One on 26 July 2015. The six-part series is an adaptation of two Tommy and Tuppence detective novels by Agatha Christie. The novels are adapted from the short stories of Partners in Crime; the first three episodes from the 1922 novel The Secret Adversary, and the last three episodes from the 1941 novel N or M? The series was not renewed for a second series by the BBC.

Alterations
The action is updated from the 1922 and 1941 settings of the novels to the 1950s, and the era of the Cold War against Stalin.

Characters
Thomas (Tommy) Beresford (David Walliams), in his early 40s, is a clever and logical man whose business ventures never quite work out, just as his university and army days were never successful. He tries to look after his spirited wife, Tuppence, and his son, George, by various money-making schemes. He does not realise that he has no head for business, but he does have a knack for espionage and crime-solving in a Cold War world full of double agents and assassins. It is a perilous world, in which Tommy flourishes.

Prudence (Tuppence) Beresford (Jessica Raine) is a quick-witted, irrepressible woman with a tendency to leap without looking. The daughter of a country archdeacon, one of five children, she misses the sense of purpose she had as a nurse in the war and cannot settle as a housewife, despite her love for Tommy and their son, George. When the opportunity is presented to aid British Intelligence in the defence of her country, she jumps at the chance to put herself, and her less willing husband, in harm's way.

Major Anthony Carter (James Fleet) is Tommy's uncle and head of "The Third Floor", a branch of British Military Intelligence. In the war, Carter knew who the enemy was, but now, in the 1950s, the adversary is a new type of spy. Carter tries to protect his hapless nephew Tommy and Tommy's wife, Tuppence, as they become involved in his new war.

Albert Pemberton (Matthew Steer) is a chemistry teacher and part-time agent for Carter. He met Tommy in hospital whilst recovering from losing a hand when working for a bomb-disposal unit. He assists Tommy and Tuppence when they require more technical knowledge,  and he revels in their adventures.

Production
The series was commissioned by Ben Stephenson and Charlotte Moore for the BBC to mark the 125th anniversary of Agatha Christie's birth. The adaptation was produced by Endor Productions in partnership with Agatha Christie Productions.

Conception
David Walliams and Hilary Strong (Agatha Christie Group) approached Hilary Bevan Jones and Tom Nash (development producer) of Endor Productions with the idea of re-inventing the Agatha Christie characters Tommy and Tuppence Beresford. Walliams liked the idea of a married amateur detective duo bickering over a dead body.

Agatha Christie wrote stories featuring the Beresfords between 1922 and 1973, depicting Tommy and Tuppence from before they were married through to their old age with adult children. It was decided to set the series in the 1950s, in the context of the Cold War, which could be made to fit Christie's existing stories. The two novels chosen, The Secret Adversary and N or M?, were each made into three one-hour episodes, for a total of six.

Casting
David Walliams, the main driving force and executive producer, plays Tommy. Jessica Raine plays Tuppence, and was cast for her ability to move between drama and humour.

Filming

Creating 1950s England led to filming in central and greater London, Essex, Buckinghamshire, Surrey, Oxfordshire, Kent, Hertfordshire, and Norfolk. Didcot Railway Centre and North Norfolk Railway, Sheringham were used for period railway locations. Cromer in Norfolk was used for its coastline and pier and many unspoilt  buildings and streets in the town. Englefield House and derelict industrial wastelands by the Thames. The Historic Dockyard in Chatham was used for London street scenes, and Fort Amherst in Kent was featured as the coastal tunnels.

Cast

Main
David Walliams as Tommy Beresford
Jessica Raine as Tuppence Beresford
James Fleet as Major Anthony Carter
Matthew Steer as Albert Pemberton

Guest stars
Miles Roughley as George Beresford (Episode 1)
Clarke Peters as Julius Hersheimmer (Episodes 1–3)
Alice Krige as Rita Vandemeyer (Episodes 1–2)
Paul Brennen as Lucky (Episodes 1–3)
Jonny Phillips as Whittington (Episodes 1–3)
Camilla Marie Beeput as Jane Finn (Episodes 1–3)
Madeline Appiah as Annette (Episodes 1–3)
Andrew Havill as James Peel (Episodes 2–3)
Ed Speleers as Carl Denim (Episodes 4–6)
Roy Marsden as Commander Haydock (Episodes 4–6)
Alyy Khan as Major Khan (Episodes 4–5)
Danny Lee Wynter as Gilbert Worthing (Episodes 4–6)
Christina Cole as Mrs Sprot (Episodes 4–6)
Aoife McMahon as Sheila Perenna (Episodes 4–6)
Pinar Ogun as Veronika Urbanowicz (Episodes 4–6)
Robert Hands as Frederick Minton (Episodes 4–6)
Issy van Randwyck as Elizabeth Minton (Episodes 4–6)
Tam Williams as Harrison (Episodes 4–6)
Hannah Waddingham as Blonde Assassin (Episodes 4–6)
Tamsin Dean as Hotel waitress (Episode 5)

Episodes

Broadcast

The series aired on the BBC in the UK in 2015 and was co-produced by and released on Acorn TV in the US as an original series. Five years later in 2020, Ovation acquired the US TV broadcast rights to the series, and it premiered in June 2020. It aired all six episodes until July 12, 2020.

Critical reception
For Ellen E Jones, writing in UK newspaper The Independent on Sunday, "Part of the enjoyable comfort of Christie on TV is the period detail and the BBC has pulled this off with much more visual flair than ITV ever managed". Jones found Walliams and Raine to be, "as well turned out as Cary Grant and Eva Marie Saint, or James Stewart and Kim Novak; it's only a shame their interactions don't fizz with the same sexual chemistry”, but added, “At least the two leads are individually endearing”. She also noted “a promising cast of support characters".

In The Daily Telegraph, Michael Hogan mocked the second episode's plot, writing: "Locks were picked, typewriters were thrown through windows and a narrow escape was made down a drainpipe. This was Scooby Doo stuff. The Russian assassin would've got away with it if it wasn't for those pesky Brits".  But he also found that, "Walliams's performance was less muted than in last week's opener, when he played it too straight and ended up being thoroughly outshone by Raine. Here they were on more of an equal footing", and concluded: "This might be featherlight fare but sometimes handsomely produced historical fun is just the ticket for a Sunday night – see also Downton Abbey. Partners in Crimes impressive ratings (6.5 million last week) suggest it will tide plenty of us over until Downtons return this autumn. Jolly good show".

The Irish Independents Pat Stacey was much less impressed, saying, "When the hero and heroine of your mystery drama are a posh 1950s married couple called Tommy and Tuppence Beresford, you're probably half-hobbled already.  When Tommy is played by David Walliams, you might as well invest in a pair of crutches. Jessica Raine is fine as the crime fiction-addicted Tuppence […] but Walliams is grossly miscast. You never for a second believe these two could be married with a young son. Required to handle a straightish dramatic role, Walliams underplays it to the point of passivity half of the time. When he's not doing that, he veers too far in the other direction, making Tommy the kind of faintly dim, ham-fisted ditherer that couldn't investigate his way through his own front door". Overall, Stacey, found: "It doesn't do to scrutinise the plot's improbable leaps and bounds. Like Hitchcock's The Lady Vanishes and The 39 Steps, both of which it superficially resembles, Partners in Crime is supposed to be a rattling, old-style good yarn. The problem is that it creaks more than it rattles, lumbering ponderously from one laboured scene to another".

See also
And Then There Were None
Agatha Christie's Partners in Crime, 1983 series

References

External links
 
 
BBC press pack

2010s British drama television series
2015 British television series debuts
2015 British television series endings
Television shows based on works by Agatha Christie
BBC television dramas
2010s British television miniseries
English-language television shows
2010s British mystery television series
Tommy and Tuppence
Television series set in the 1950s
Television shows filmed in the United Kingdom